Didier Van Damme (born 1929) European adviser. He was also composer and conductor.

Some of his notable compositions are ADAGIO TO EUROPE (Adagio à l'Europe) (1970), and Concerto de la Reine (Queen's Concerto) (1960), written on the occasion of the wedding of King Baudouin of Belgium to Queen Fabiola.

External links 
 http://www.europe2020.org/en/section_audio/AdagioEurope/adagio.htm
 https://web.archive.org/web/20160307153344/http://www.teacheurope.org/BrochureConcoursEurope72.**
 http://www.ieri.be
 http://www.aiace-be.eu
 http://www.schott-music.com/shop/show,89232,cmss,3365.html

Belgian composers
Male composers
Belgian male musicians
1929 births
Possibly living people